Magdalene Stirling (1765 – 1846) was a Scottish composer best known for Twelve Tunes Composed by Miss Stirling of Ardoch, which she had printed privately in 1796.

Stirling was the youngest of five daughters born in Ardoch, Perthshire, to Christian Erskine and Sir William Stirling, the 4th Baronet of Ardoch. She was friendly with Niel and Nathaniel Gow, who published some of her compositions. Gow sometimes published Stirling’s works without attribution, or “as composed by Miss Stirling of Ardoch.”

Stirling’s fiddle and instrumental tunes include:

Ardoch House
Boyne Hunt (also known as Molly Maguire or Perthshire Hunt)
Colonel Noel’s Fancy
Countess of Sutherland’s Strathspey
Dear Lamb
Dunira Lodge
Earl of Elgen’s Strathspey
Honorable Charles Bruce’s Reel
Lord Torphichen’s Strathspey (also known as Lord Torphichen’s Favorite)
Mr. Stirling of Keir’s Reel
Perthshire Volunteers
Sir William Stirling’s Strathspey
Twelve Tunes Composed by Miss Stirling of Ardoch
Wager
 View compositions by Magdalene Stirling

References 

Scottish composers
1765 births
1846 deaths
British women composers